The 1960 United States Senate election in Nebraska took place on November 8, 1960. The incumbent Republican Senator, Carl Curtis, was re-elected by a smaller margin than 1954. He defeated Democratic candidate Robert B. Conrad. His victory underperformed Richard Nixon, the Republican presidential nominee, who won Nebraska by 24% in the presidential election.

Democratic primary

Candidates
Ralph G. Brooks, Governor of Nebraska
Clair A. Callan, chairman of Governor's Committee on State Government Reorganization Board and Nebraska Power Review Board

Results

Replacement of Brooks 
The winner of the Democratic primary, Ralph G. Brooks, died on September 9, 1960. He was replaced on the ballot by Robert B. Conrad, Brooks's administrative assistant.

Republican primary

Candidates
Carl Curtis, the incumbent Senator

Results

Results

References 

1960
Nebraska
United States Senate